Rock Radio is a former British radio network.

Rock Radio or Rock FM may also refer to:

Rock FM (Spanish radio station)
Rock FM (British radio station), based in Preston, Lancashire
Rock FM 91.9, a radio station based in Johannesburg, South Africa
The Rock Radio Network, based in Puerto Rico

See also
Radio Rock